Valois may refer to:

People
 House of Valois, French royal house descended from the counts of Valois
 Agnès-Marie Valois (1914–2018), French religious sister and nurse who cared for the wounded in the World War II raid on Dieppe
 Charles-Omer Valois (born 1924), Canadian Roman Catholic bishop
 Ève Valois (1963–2000), French adult model, television presenter, pornographic actress and singer, known professionally as Lolo Ferrari
 Georges Valois (1878–1945), French journalist and politician
 Henri Valois (1607–1692), French classical historian
 Jean-Louis Valois (born 1973), French footballer
 Johanne Valois (born 1953), Canadian handball player
 Jonathan Valois (born 1971), Canadian politician
 Joseph Valois (1767–1835), businessman, farmer and political figure in Lower Canada
 Léonise Valois (1868–1936), French-Canadian poet
 Luislinda Valois (born 1942), Salvadoran-born Brazilian jurist, magistrate and politician
 Michel-François Valois (1801–1869), physician and political figure in Canada East
 Noël Valois (1855–1915), French historian
 Philippe Valois (1907–1986), Canadian politician
 Victor Valois (1841–1924), German Imperial Navy vice-admiral

Places
 County, later Duchy, of Valois, France, governed by the counts and dukes of Valois
 Valois, Pointe-Claire, Quebec, Canada, a neighbourhood in the city of Pointe-Claire
 Valois station, a commuter rail station

Other uses
 Rue de Valois, a street in Paris
 Valois sauce, a variation of Béarnaise sauce